Holiday Destination is the third studio album by English musician Nadine Shah. It was released in August 2017 under 1965 Records. The album was produced by Ben Hillier.

The album was nominated for a Mercury Prize in 2018.

Track listing

Accolades

Chart

References

2017 albums
Nadine Shah albums
Albums produced by Ben Hillier